
Columbus Avenue (est.1860) in Boston, Massachusetts, runs from Park Square to just south of Melnea Cass Boulevard, as well as from Tremont  Street to Walnut Avenue and Seaver Street, where it continues as Seaver Street to Blue Hill Avenue and to Erie Street, where it ends. It intersects the South End and Roxbury neighborhoods.

Buildings & tenants

 African Methodist Episcopal Zion Church
 Armory of the First Corps of Cadets
 Doris Bunte Apartments
 Charlie's Sandwich Shoppe
 Home for Aged Couples
 Northeastern University
 Roxbury Community College
 Youth's Companion Building

Former buildings & tenants
 Allan Crite
 Boston Flower Exchange
 Hotel Statler, Columbus Avenue and Arlington Street
 Massachusetts Metaphysical College
 Pope Manufacturing Company, 1890s
 Savoy Cafe
 South End Grounds
 Temple Israel (Boston)
 Vega Company
 Waitt & Bond Factory (Later owned by Alles & Fisher, now part of Northeastern University)

Images

References

External links

 Bostonian Society has materials related to the street.
 Historic American Buildings Survey (Library of Congress). 
 Police Station No. 10, 1170 Columbus Avenue, Boston. "This building is one of the first municipal buildings built in Roxbury after its annexation to Boston in 1868. It is also important as a work by Gridley J.F. Bryant, who with various partners designed a number of buildings in Boston and New England in the late 19th century."
 Edison-Spencer-Grafton Block, 254-264 Columbus Avenue, Boston 
 New York Public Library. Item related to Columbus Ave., Boston
 Boston College. 
 Hotel Statler, Columbus Avenue and Arlington Street photo, 1926
 Intersection of Stuart Street and Columbus Avenue, photo c. 1933
 City of Boston Archives. Photo of Columbus Avenue divisional strip project, June 2, 1948
 Columbus Avenue looking north east toward Concord Square, Columbus Ave. Anniversary of Battle of Bunker Hill, 1875. Photo by J.W. Black
 MIT. Photo

Streets in Boston
South End, Boston
Roxbury, Boston